The SNCF Class CC 72100 is a class of C′C′ diesel-electric locomotives rebuilt from CC 72000 locomotives during  2002–2004.

30 locomotives were converted: 21, 30, 37–41, 43, 45, 47, 48, 51, 56–60, 63, 66, 68, 72, 75–80, 82, 86, 89–90. They find use on the Paris - Mulhouse line and are based at Chalindrey.

Alstom locomotives
C′C′ locomotives
CC 72100
72100
Railway locomotives introduced in 2002
Standard gauge locomotives of France

Passenger locomotives 
Rebuilt locomotives